Rusʹ–Byzantine War may refer to one of the following conflicts:
The probably apocryphal raid of Bravlin against Byzantine possessions in the Crimea (late 8th/early 9th century)
Paphlagonian expedition of the Rusʹ (830s)
Rusʹ–Byzantine War (860)
Rusʹ–Byzantine War (907)
Rusʹ–Byzantine War (941)
Rusʹ–Byzantine War (970–971)
Rus'–Byzantine War (987)
Rusʹ–Byzantine War (1024)
Rusʹ–Byzantine War (1043)

See also
 Byzantino-Slavic wars (disambiguation)